Al Saeed University is a university in Taiz, Yemen.  It was founded in 2004, and added several departments in applied and medical sciences in 2013.  The university was funded by Hayel Saeed Anam Group.  Biochemist Eqbal Dauqan was Head of the Department of Medical Laboratories Sciences.  In 2015 the university was bombed as part of the Yemeni Civil War, causing it to shut down.

References

External links 
 Official website

Universities in Yemen
Taiz
2004 establishments in Yemen